Jessica Gloria Lynn Clarke (born 1983) is an American lawyer from New York who is the designate to serve as a United States district judge of the United States District Court for the Southern District of New York.

Education 

Clarke received her Bachelor of Arts from Northwestern University in 2005 and her Juris Doctor, cum laude, from the Ohio State University Moritz College of Law in 2008.

Career 

Clarke began her law career as a law clerk for Judge Solomon Oliver Jr. of the United States District Court for the Northern District of Ohio from 2008 to 2010. From 2010 to 2016, she served as a trial attorney in the Housing & Civil Enforcement Section of the Civil Rights Division of the United States Department of Justice. She then worked at the boutique litigation firm Emery Celli Brinckerhoff Abady Ward & Maazel LLP, first as an associate from 2016 to 2018 and then as of counsel from 2018 to 2019. From 2019 to 2023, she served as chief of the Civil Rights Bureau at the New York State Office of Attorney General, overseeing the bureau's work on violations of civil rights law in New York.

Nomination to district court 

On December 15, 2021, President Joe Biden nominated Clarke to serve as a United States district judge of the United States District Court for the Southern District of New York to a seat vacated by Judge Colleen McMahon, who assumed senior status on April 21, 2021. On January 12, 2022, a hearing on her nomination was held before the Senate Judiciary Committee. During her hearing, Republican senators questioned her over her role on an investigation related to the George Floyd protests. On February 10, 2022, the committee were deadlocked on her nomination by an 11–11 vote. On June 23, 2022, the United States Senate discharged her nomination from the committee by a 50–49 vote. On January 3, 2023, her nomination was returned to the President under Rule XXXI, Paragraph 6 of the United States Senate; she was renominated later the same day. On February 9, 2023, her nomination was reported out of committee by an 11–10 vote. On March 16, 2023, the Senate invoked cloture on her nomination by a 49–45 vote. Later that day, her nomination was confirmed by a 48–43 vote. She is awaiting her judicial commission.

See also 
 List of African-American federal judges
 List of African-American jurists

References

External links 

 

1983 births
Living people
21st-century American judges
21st-century American lawyers
21st-century American women judges
21st-century American women lawyers
African-American judges
African-American lawyers
Judges of the United States District Court for the Southern District of New York
New York (state) lawyers
Northwestern University alumni
Ohio State University Moritz College of Law alumni
People from Akron, Ohio
United States district court judges appointed by Joe Biden